Isaac Shorr (ca. 1884–1964) was a 20th-century American immigration and naturalization lawyer and philosophical anarchist who worked with other important, radical lawyers in the 1920s–1940s and whose legal partners included:  Swinburne Hale, Walter Nelles, Joseph R. Brodsky, and Carol Weiss King.

Background

Isaac Shorr was born about 1882 in Russia (at that time, the Russian Empire).  In 1904, his family emigrated to the United States. In 1913, he graduated from New York University School of Law after studying at night and working by day as a cigarmaker. In 1915, he was admitted to the New York bar.

Career

During World War I, Shorr was a partner of Hale, Nelles, and Shorr, which "defended radicals."  In 1920, Hale wrote to Tom Mooney, "We are in a hot bed of repression here, with only a very few lawyers who are willing and able to handle the situation, and who are hopelessly overworked."  His partners were Swinburne Hale and Walter Nelles. Carlo Tresca, a prominent Italian anarchist, was well acquainted with them. Shorr and Nelles served as counsel to the American Civil Liberties Union (ACLU). The firm support legal investigations published in the 67-page Report upon the Illegal Practices of the United States Department of Justice by the National Popular Government League (NGPL); Swinburne Hale did a majority of the work on the report.

In 1920, Shorr testified before Congress that he was representing more than 60 people involved in deportation during the Palmer Raids.  In fact, during the Palmer Raids, the U.S. Government noted:  Mr. Shorr is well known to the department because of his activities as attorney for these people.  He many times has appeared as attorney for salients who have never seen him until the hearing and disclaimed any knowledge of his retainer. Mr. Shorr is one of the most active leaders of these people in the United States, and at the present time his office is the address at which persons in this country receive incendiary correspondence from persons deported on the Buford.

Joseph R. Brodsky and Carol Weiss King worked with this firm, as did Vito Marcantonio (whose mentor was Brodsky).

In 1924, Shorr and Nelles appealed United States ex rel. Tisi v. Tod (1924) and United States ex rel. Mensevich v. Tod before the U.S. Supreme Court.

By 1924, Shorr was a member of "Shorr, Brodsky, and King" (also called "Brodsky, King & Shorr," called a "loose" partnership).  The other two partners were:
 Joseph R. Brodsky, chief counsel of the International Labor Defense (ILD), legal arm of the Communist Party of the USA (then the Workers Party of America, best known for his work on the legal defense team of the Scottsboro Boys
 Carol Weiss King, the youngest, who was just starting her career as immigration and civil rights lawyer, best known for her defense of alleged Communists Harry Bridges, Gerhart Eisler, and J. Peters
Brodsky helped found the ILD with King's help; King founded the International Juridical Association (IJA) with Brodsky's help.

In 1927, Shorr associated with Clarence Darrow and Arthur Garfield Hays to help defend the anti‐Fascists Calogero Greco and Donato Carillo for the alleged murder of the Fascist Joseph Carisi (Giuseppe Carisi) in the Bronx. On December 9, 1927, the trial began, and the full defense team included Darrow, Hays, Shorr, and King. They won an acquittal. 

In 1934, the American Committee for Protection of Foreign Born (ACPFB) retained Shorr and King defended Domenico Sallitti (also known as Domenic Sallitti, an "alien anarchist") in the Ferrero-Sallitti Case in San Francisco.  Sallitti's friend Valerio Isca organized their defense, created a Ferrero-Sallittii Defense Conference, and enlisted Rose Pesotta of the ILGWU to help raise bail.  Supporters likened their case to that of Sacco and Vanzetti.

Personal and death

Shorr married Bessie Goldenburg; they had two daughters.

He was a "ponderous, philosophical anarchist."

Shorr died aged 82 on April 23, 1964.

Shorr's grandson Gene Weingarten is a Washington Post journalist who has won two Pulitzer Prizes for feature writing.

See also

 Palmer Raids
 Swinburne Hale
 Walter Nelles
 Joseph R. Brodsky
 International Labor Defense
 Carol Weiss King
 International Juridical Association
 Clarence Darrow 
 Arthur Garfield Hays

References

1880s births
1964 deaths
American trade union leaders